Banići is a village in Croatia. It is located near Slano in the Dubrovačko Primorje municipality within the Dubrovnik-Neretva County in the south of the country. The village has a church dedicated to Mary Magdalene.

Gallery

External links
Banići  at the Dubrovačko Primorje municipality official website 

Populated places in Dubrovnik-Neretva County